This is a list of notable events in country music that took place in the year 1938.

Events

Top Hillbilly-Folk (Country) Recordings 1938

The following songs were extracted from records included in Joel Whitburn's Pop Memories 1890-1954, record sales reported on the "Discography of American Historical Recordings" website, and other sources as specified. Numerical rankings are approximate, they are only used as a frame of reference.

Births 
 January 30 - Norma Jean, female singer of the 1960s and regular on The Porter Wagoner Show from 1961 to 1967.
 March 12 – Lew DeWitt, songwriter and former member of The Statler Brothers (he sang tenor) (died 1990).
 March 18 – Charley Pride, the most successful African-American country music performer, active since the mid-1960s.
 April 4 – Norro Wilson, prominent songwriter and record producer (died 2017).
 August 18 – Allen Reynolds, prominent record producer, best known for his association with Garth Brooks.
 August 21 – Kenny Rogers, pop-styled country crooner who has enjoyed hits since the late 1960s (died 2020).

Further reading 
 Kingsbury, Paul, "Vinyl Hayride: Country Music Album Covers 1947–1989," Country Music Foundation, 2003
 Millard, Bob, "Country Music: 70 Years of America's Favorite Music," HarperCollins, New York, 1993
 Whitburn, Joel. "Top Country Songs 1944–2005 – 6th Edition." 2005.

References

Country
Country music by year